Pierre Bernard may refer to:

Pierre Bernard (comedian), American graphic designer and comedian
Pierre Bernard (footballer) (1932–2014), French soccer player
Pierre Bernard (graphic designer) (1942–2015), French graphic designer
Pierre Bernard (industrialist) (1922–1991), French industrialist
Pierre Bernard (Montfermeil politician) (born 1934), French politician
Pierre Bernard (rugby union) (born 1989), French rugby player
Pierre Bernard (Tarn politician) (1934–2020), French politician
Pierre Bernard (yogi) (1875–1955), American yogi, scholar, occultist, philosopher, mystic and businessman
Pierre Bernard-Reymond (born 1944), French senator